AZ Picerno, or simply Picerno, is an Italian association football club, representing the town of Picerno, Province of Potenza, Basilicata. It is currently playing in Serie C.

History 
Founded in 1973, AZ Picerno mostly languished as an amateur club in the minor league of the Italian football system throughout its history.

The club turned its fortunes thanks to Donato Curcio, a local native who emigrated to the United States in the 1950s who first donated 1 million Euro for a new football stadium (named after him) in Picerno, and then starting investing directly into the club in the later years.

On 18 April 2019, Picerno mathematically ensured their first historical promotion to Serie C after a 0–0 draw with Taranto guaranteed them first place in the Round H of Serie D.

Due to restrictions to the local football stadium "Comunale Donato Curcio", which is unsuitable for professional league games, Picerno played its home games in the 2019–20 Serie C season at the Stadio Alfredo Viviani in neighbouring Potenza. The season ended with Picerno being immediately relegated back to Serie D.

After completing the 2020–21 Serie D season in second place, Picerno was readmitted to Serie C to fill a vacancy for the 2021–22 season.

Current squad
.

Out on loan

References

External links
Official website

Football clubs in Basilicata
Association football clubs established in 1974
1974 establishments in Italy